Kosmos 936 or Bion 4 (Бион 4, Космос 936) was a Bion satellite. The mission involved nine countries in a series of biomedical research experiments. The experiments were primarily follow-ups to the Bion 3 (Kosmos 782) flight. Scientists from the Bulgaria, Czechoslovakia, East Germany, France, Hungary, Poland, Romania, the United States and the Soviet Union conducted experiments in physics and biology on the mission.

Spacecraft 
The spacecraft was based on the Zenit reconnaissance satellite and launches began in 1973 with primary emphasis on the problems of radiation effects on human beings. Launches in the program included Kosmos 110, 605, 670, 782, plus Nauka modules flown on Zenit-2M reconnaissance satellites. 90 kg of equipment could be contained in the external Nauka module.

Launch 
Kosmos 936 was launched on 3 August 1977, at 14:01:00 UTC by a Soyuz-U launch vehicle from Plesetsk Cosmodrome. The mission ended after 19.5 days.

Mission 

The mission was to conduct various biological studies, continuing the Bion 3 mission experiments. He had two centrifuges on board to put some specimens in an artificial gravity environment. An attempt was made to differentiate, using rats, between the effects caused by space flight itself from those caused by stress. The effects of flight on muscle and bone, on red cell survival, and on lipid and carbohydrate metabolism were also studied, and an experiment with rats on the effects of space radiation on the retina was conducted.

One of the instruments (without a biological part) studied the physical parameters of the components of space radiation. Fruit flies were used in genetics and aging studies. Twenty of the rats experienced microgravity and the other ten were subjected to the artificial gravity of the centrifuge.

See also 

 1977 in spaceflight

References

Bibliography 
 Kozlov, D. I. (1996), Mashnostroenie, ed., Konstruirovanie avtomaticheskikh kosmicheskikh apparatov, Moscow, ISBN
 Melnik, T. G. (1997), Nauka, ed., Voenno-Kosmicheskiy Sili, Moscow, ISBN
 "Bion' nuzhen lyudyam", Novosti Kosmonavtiki, (6): 35, 1996

Bion satellites
Kosmos satellites
Spacecraft launched in 1977
1977 in spaceflight
1977 in the Soviet Union
Czechoslovakia–Soviet Union relations
Romania–Soviet Union relations
Hungary–Soviet Union relations
Poland–Soviet Union relations
France–Soviet Union relations
Soviet Union–United States relations
East Germany–Soviet Union relations